William Saurin was an  waterline length trimaran that was sailed across the Atlantic ocean in 1984.

See also
 List of multihulls

References

Trimarans
1980s sailing yachts